Clement Smith may refer to:

 Clement Smith (administrator) (died 1552), of Great Baddow, MP for Maldon
 Clement Leslie Smith (1878–1927), VC recipient
 Clement Smith (footballer) (1910–1970), footballer for Chester, Halifax Town and Stoke City
 Clement Smith (priest) (died 1921), Canon of Windsor
 Clement Smith (Australian politician) (1894–1968), member of the South Australian House of Assembly
 Clement A. Smith (1901–1988), American pediatrician

See also
 Clem Smith (disambiguation)